This is a list of airlines currently operating in Jamaica.

See also
 List of defunct airlines of Jamaica
 List of airlines

References

Jamaica
Airlines
Airlines
Jamaica